Nina Klenovska (born May 7, 1980 in Bansko), previously Nina Kadeva is a Bulgarian biathlete.

Klenovska competed in the 2006 and 2010 Winter Olympics for Bulgaria. Her best performance was 48th in the 2010 individual. She also finished 54th in the 2006  individual and 62nd in the 2010 sprint.

As of February 2013, her best performance at the Biathlon World Championships is 6th, as part of the 2009 Finnish mixed relay team. Her best individual performance is 50th, in the individual races in 2003 and 2012.

As of February 2013, Klenovska has finished on the podium once in the Biathlon World Cup, as part of the Bulgarian women's relay team at Östersund in 2002/03. Her best individual result is 25th, in the sprint at Antholz in 2010/11. Her best overall finish in the Biathlon World Cup is 64th, in 2002/03.

World Cup Podiums

References

External links
 

1980 births
Biathletes at the 2006 Winter Olympics
Biathletes at the 2010 Winter Olympics
Bulgarian female biathletes
Living people
Olympic biathletes of Bulgaria
People from Bansko
Macedonian Bulgarians
Sportspeople from Blagoevgrad Province
21st-century Bulgarian women